The 2019 Social Democratic Party of Germany leadership election took place in the autumn of 2019 to elect the new leadership of the Social Democratic Party of Germany following the resignation of the Andrea Nahles on 3 June 2019. Although the leader(s) of the party are elected indirectly by a party convention, for the first time since 1993 the SPD held a vote by the membership to decide the candidate(s) which the party's executive board will propose to the party convention. Though the convention is not obliged to elect the proposed candidates, the membership vote is considered politically binding.

The membership vote was held in two rounds, with the top two tickets from the first round proceeding to a runoff. In the first round held between 14 and 25 October, Olaf Scholz and Klara Geywitz placed first with 22.7% of the vote, while Norbert Walter-Borjans and Saskia Esken placed second with 21.0%. In the second round, Walter-Borjans and Esken won with 53.1% of the vote to Scholz and Geywitz's 45.3%.

This was seen as an upset victory for the left-wing of the SPD, including skeptics of the grand coalition with the CDU. Esken and Walter-Borjans were little-known to the public at large, Esken being a backbencher in the Bundestag and Walter-Borjans being the former Minister of Finance of North Rhine-Westphalia from 2010 to 2017. Scholz, a business-friendly fiscal conservative, on the other hand had the backing of much of the party establishment, including General Secretary Lars Klingbeil and several Minister-Presidents such as Stephan Weil and Hamburg First Mayor Peter Tschentscher.

In December 2019, the SPD party convention elected Walter-Borjans and Esken as the new co-leaders of the party. Though they had previously hinted an end the grand coalition with the CDU, they backed away from that, first proposing a revision of the coalition agreement. The CDU did not accept this and thus, the coalition continued.

Walter-Borjans and Esken proved to be unpopular and barely-known leaders and their parties poll numbers did not recover from the low to mid tens. In August 2020, Walter-Borjans and Esken nominated the much more popular Scholz to be their Chancellor candidate for which they were widely mocked. However, in near the end of the 2021 German federal election, Scholz's personal popularity fueled a sudden surge of the SPD in the polls, leading to their victory and, eventually, Scholz becoming Chancellor.

Scholz's running mate, Klara Geywitz, who had lost her seat in the Landtag of Brandenburg during the campaign and went to work for the Brandenburg Court of Audit, would later be appointed Minister for Housing, Urban Development and Building by Scholz to his cabinet.

Background
In the 2017 federal election, the SPD won just 20.5% of votes cast, its worst result in the history of the Federal Republic. Party leader Martin Schulz subsequently announced that the SPD would not renew the grand coalition with the Christian Democratic Union (CDU) in which it had served since 2013. However, in November, after it became clear that there were no viable alternatives, Schulz reneged on his pledge and called an extraordinary party conference which voted to negotiate a new coalition agreement with the CDU. Schulz was subject to significant opposition and criticism from the party, and resigned as leader in February 2018. However, the coalition agreement was approved by 66.0% of the party members in a vote held later that month, and the SPD re-entered government.

Schulz proposed Andrea Nahles as his successor, and she was confirmed as the SPD's new leader at a party convention in April 2018. Nahles quickly faced difficulties with the new government as many disputes arose over the summer of 2018, including the "asylum quarrel" and controversy around Hans-Georg Maaßen. Nahles was unable to stabilize her party as its performance in opinion polling declined to record lows, accompanied by a string of historically poor state election performances. In national polling, the SPD was overtaken by the Greens in October 2018, and the party polled around 15% through early 2019. In the 2019 European elections held on 26 May, the SPD placed third, winning only 15.8% of votes cast – the worst result for the party on a national level since 1887. Nahles came under major pressure to step down, and announced her resignation on 3 June. The party was thereafter led by acting leaders Malu Dreyer, Thorsten Schäfer-Gümbel and Manuela Schwesig until the party conference in December which elected the new leadership.

Procedure
Party members were permitted to declare their candidacy between 1 July and 1 September. Candidates were able to run as a sole candidate to head the party alone, or with another member on a two-person ticket to serve as co-leaders. In the latter case, at least one candidate was required to be female. Each single candidate or two-person ticket needed sufficient support from state, regional, or local SPD associations in order to run. The requirements were one state association, one regional district, or five local districts. If no candidacy receives an absolute majority of the votes cast in the first round, the two candidacies with the highest number of votes cast proceed to a second round. Both votes were to be considered invalid if less than 20% of the party membership participated. The party's executive board was to propose the winner of the vote to the party convention which took place between 6 and 8 December.

Candidates

Candidates

Individuals who have publicly expressed interest 
 Thomas Kuschaty, Leader of the SPD-group in the North Rhine-Westphalia state parliament and former North Rhine-Westphalia State Minister of Justice (2010–2017) 
 Khalil Bawar, teacher, business consultant and two time (unsuccessful) candidate for the Hamburg state parliament
 Lars Klingbeil, SPD general secretary (since 2017)

Declined to be candidates 
 Malu Dreyer, Minister President of Rhineland-Palatinate (since 2013) and acting leader of the SPD
 Manuela Schwesig, Minister President of Mecklenburg-Vorpommern (since 2017) and acting leader of the SPD
 Thorsten Schäfer-Gümbel, acting leader of the SPD
 Hubertus Heil, Federal Minister for Labour and Social affairs (since 2018)
 Stephan Weil, Minister President of Lower Saxony (since 2013)
 Anke Rehlinger, Deputy Minister President of Saarland (since 2013) and State Minister Minister for the Economy, Labour, Energy and Transport (since 2014)
 Franziska Giffey, Federal Minister for Family Affairs, Senior Citizens, Women and Youth (since 2018)

Opinion polling

Among members

Among officials

Among voters

Results

|- style="background-color:#E9E9E9;text-align:center;"
! style="text-align:left;" colspan="2" rowspan="2"| Candidates
! colspan="2"| 1st round
! colspan="2"| 2nd round
|- style="background-color:#E9E9E9;text-align:center;"
! width="75"|Votes
! width="30"|%
! width="75"|Votes
! width="30"|%
|-
| style="background-color:;"|
| style="text-align:left;"| Olaf Scholz & Klara Geywitz
| 48,473
| 22.68
| 98,246
| 45.33
|-
| style="background-color:;"|
| style="text-align:left;"| Norbert Walter-Borjans & Saskia Esken
| 44,967
| 21.04
| 114,995
| 53.06
|-
| style="background-color:;"|
| style="text-align:left;"| Christina Kampmann & Michael Roth
| 34,793
| 16.28
| style="background-color:#E9E9E9;" colspan="2" rowspan="5"|
|-
| style="background-color:;"|
| style="text-align:left;"| Nina Scheer & Karl Lauterbach
| 31,271
| 14.63
|-
| style="background-color:;"|
| style="text-align:left;"| Petra Köpping & Boris Pistorius
| 31,230
| 14.41
|-
| style="background-color:;"|
| style="text-align:left;"| Gesine Schwan & Ralf Stegner
| 20,583
| 9.63
|-
| style="background-color:#E9E9E9;" colspan="4"|
|-
|colspan="2" align="left" | Voting members
|align="right"| 425,630 
|align="right"| 100.0
|align="right"| 425,630 
|align="right"| 100.0
|-
|colspan="2" align=left| Total votes 
|align="right"| 226,775	
|align="right"| 53.28
|align="right"| 230,215
|align="right"| 54.09
|-
|colspan="2" align=left| Abstentions
|align="right"| 2,376
|align="right"| 1.11
|align="right"| 3,480
|align="right"| 1.60
|-
|colspan="2" align="left" | Permitted votes
|align="right"| 214,956
|align="center"| ?
|align="right"| 217,175
|align="center"| ?
|-
|-
|colspan="2" align="left" | Valid votes
|align="right"| 213,693
|align="center"| ?
|align="right"| 216,721
|align="center"| ?
|-
|colspan="2" align=left|Invalid/blank votes
|align="right"| 1,263
|align="center"| ?
|align="right"| 454
|align="center"| ?
|-
| style="text-align:left" colspan="8"|
1st round results – Click here  2nd round results – Click here
|}

References

Social Democratic Party of Germany
2019 elections in Germany
Political party leadership elections in Germany
Social Democratic Party of Germany leadership election
Olaf Scholz